Dabbin Fever is a mixtape by American rapper Rich The Kid. It was released on December 24, 2015. The mixtape features guest appearances from Wiz Khalifa, Migos, Skippa Da Flippa, HoodRich Pablo Juan, 21 Savage, Jose Guapo and more. The mixtape features production by Sledgren, Zaytoven, Murda Beatz, OG Parker, Drumma Boy, DJMoBeatz and MexikoDro.

Track listing

References

2015 mixtape albums
Rich the Kid albums
Albums produced by Zaytoven
Albums produced by Drumma Boy
Albums produced by Murda Beatz